The Royal Canadian Navy uses hull classification symbols to identify the types of its ships, which are similar to the United States Navy's hull classification symbol system. The Royal Navy and some European and Commonwealth navies (19 in total) use a somewhat analogous system of pennant numbers.

In a ship name such as  the ship prefix HMCS for His or Her Majesty's Canadian Ship indicates the vessel is a warship in service to the Monarch of Canada, while the proper name Algonquin may follow a naming convention for the class of vessel.  The hull classification symbol in the example is the parenthetical suffix (DDG 283), where the hull classification type DDG indicates that the Algonquin is a guided-missile destroyer and the hull classification number 283 is unique within that type.  Listed below are various hull classification types with some currently in use and others that are retired and no longer in use.

Auxiliary ships
 AGOR: Auxiliary General Oceanographic Research (retired), 
 AGSC: surveying vessel (retired) Example included: 
 AOR: Auxiliary Oiler Replenishment, 
 ARE: Auxiliary Replenishment Escort (retired). Examples 
 ASL: diving support vessel (retired from the Royal Canadian Navy) Included: 
 F: escort armed ships (retired pre World War II passenger ships that were converted to military roles during the war)
 FHE: Fast Hydrofoil Escort (retired, prototype tested 1968–1971), 
 K: sloop and submarine tender (also used for frigates and corvettes). Example included: 
 KC: sail training. Example includes: 
 PCT: Patrol Craft Training (supersedes YAG) Examples include: s
 T: armed trawler (retired). Example included: , 
 YAG: Yard Auxiliary General (retired training vessels, superseded by PCT) YAG training vessels CFAV Grizzly (YAG 306), CFAV Cougar (YAG 308)
 YTB: Yard Tug. Examples include: 
 YTL: Yard Tug. Examples include: s  Lawrenceville (YTL 590), CFAV Parksville (YTL 591)
 YTM: Yard Tug. Example includes:  
 YTR: Yard Tractor tug fireboats. Examples include: s

Aircraft carriers
 D: World War II escort carrier (retired) Examples included  and s: 
 R: carrier World War II (retired, was also used for destroyers)

Corvettes
 K: corvette (retired, was also used for frigates and a sloop-of-war). Examples included: s

Cruisers
 C: light cruiser (retired) Examples included

Destroyers
 D: destroyer - World War II era (retired) eg 
 DD: destroyer - World War II era (retired, DD was used by the United States Navy, I was used by the Royal Canadian Navy for US built DD destroyers)
 DDE: escort destroyer (retired) 
 DDH: air defence destroyer - helicopter, eg 
 DDG: area air defence - guided missile
 G: destroyer - World War II era (retired, included  and es)
 H: escort destroyer - World War II era (retired, included  and es)
 R: destroyer (post World War II retired, was also used for a carrier) World War II destroyer examples included:  - V class and  -

Frigates
 F: frigate
 FFH: multi-role patrol frigate - helicopter eg

Minesweepers
 MCB: post World War II minesweeper (retired) used for 
 MSA: Mine Sweeper Auxiliary:  (in use 1989–2000, retired)
 MM: Mechanical Minesweeper - more recently known as coastal defence vessels such as

Submarines
CC: World War I era gas powered submarines
CH: World War I era diesel-electric submarines
 S: Submarine (retired Cold War era diesel electric: last used by s)
 SSK: Hunter-Killer Submarine or long range submarines. Eg Victoria-class submarines

Patrol 

 AOPV: Arctic and Offshore Patrol Vessel

Notes

References

Royal Canadian Navy
Naval ships of Canada
Ship identification numbers